Brit Awards 1992 was the 12th edition of the Brit Awards, an annual pop music awards ceremony in the United Kingdom. They are run by the British Phonographic Industry and took place on 12 February 1992 at Hammersmith Apollo in London.

Performances
 Beverley Craven – "Promise Me"
 Extreme – "More Than Words"
 The KLF vs Extreme Noise Terror – "3 a.m. Eternal"
 Lisa Stansfield – "All Woman"
 P.M. Dawn – "Set Adrift on Memory Bliss"
 Seal – "Crazy"
 Simply Red – "Stars"

Winners and nominees

Multiple nominations and awards
The following artists received multiple awards and/or nominations.

KLF controversy
The KLF and Extreme Noise Terror performed a live version of "3 a.m. Eternal" at the BRIT Awards ceremony in February 1992. The Brits performance included a limping, kilted, cigar-chomping Drummond firing blanks from an automatic weapon over the heads of the crowd. After viewing the rehearsals, NME writer Danny Kelly said: "Compared to what's preceded it, this is a turbo-powered metallic wolf breaking into a coop full of particularly sick doves... And the noise? Well, the noise is hardcore punk thrash through a disco techno hit played by crusties. All bases covered, brilliantly. Clever, clever bastards." At the end of the performance, Scott Piering announced to a stunned crowd that "The KLF have now left the music business". Within a few months, they did just that - their records were deleted and the KLF retired from the industry. Kelly later described the Brits performance as the KLF's "self-destruction in an orgy of punk rock..., mock outrage ... and real bad taste".

References

External links
Brit Awards 1992 at Brits.co.uk

Brit Awards
BRIT Awards
BRIT Awards
Brit Awards
Brit
Brit Awards
Brit Awards, 12th
Brit Awards